The Shuvit Remixes is a remix album released by Malaysian rock group, Pop Shuvit. The album was released in 2004 and it is only available in Japan. It consists of eight tracks, including six remixes and two new recordings. Two new songs - "Here & Now" and "Without a Cause" was later included in their second album, Here & Now (2005).

Track listing
 "Here & Now" (2:59) 
 "Without A Cause" (3:33)
 "Skaters' Anthem" (TDR Remix) (6:14) 
 "Conversations" (Shiloh Remix) (9:57) 
 "Conversations" (DJ19 Remix) (8:11) 
 "Skaters Anthem" (Kook Mix) (Mold Remix) (6:24) 
 "Skaters' Anthem" (Hip Hop Middle Earth Mix) (4:16) 
 "Jump" (Live At Rock The World IV) (5:57)

Credits
Lyrics by 
 Amylene@Shorti (tracks: 4, 5)
 JD (6) (tracks: 3, 6)
 Jimbo (9) (tracks: 7)
 Moots (tracks: 1 to 7)
 Phlowtron (tracks: 7)
 Point (4) (tracks: 3 to 6)
 Rudy (10) (tracks: 2, 4, 5)
 Music by
 AJ (6) (tracks: 1 to 7)
 Amylene@Shorti (tracks: 4, 5)
 DJ UNO (2) (tracks: 1, 2, 4, 5, 7)
 JD (6) (tracks: 1 to 7)
 Jimbo (9) (tracks: 7)
 Moots (tracks: 7)
 Point (4) (tracks: 3, 6)
 Rudy (10) (tracks: 1 to 7)

Source:

References

External links
 The Shuvit Remixes at AllMusic

2004 remix albums
Pop Shuvit albums